Frank Wilson Asper (February 9, 1892 – November 8, 1973) was an American composer and member of the Church of Jesus Christ of Latter-day Saints who served as Mormon Tabernacle organist from 1924 to 1965.

Asper came from a musically inclined family. He studied under Ebenezer Beesley as a youth and then studied at Stern Conservatory in Berlin and the New England Conservatory, Boston University, the University of Utah and Chicago Musical College. Asper also held an honorary degree for music, issued in 1938, from Bates College. Besides being Mormon Tabernacle organist, Asper was the organist of the First United Methodist Church in Salt Lake City, Utah from 1923 to 1937. He also toured as a concertizing organist.

Asper was a fellow of the American Guild of Organists.

Works
Asper penned words and music for several LDS hymns. Seven of these are found in the 1985 hymnal Hymns of The Church of Jesus Christ of Latter-day Saints.

 132: God Is in His Holy Temple – music
 176: 'Tis Sweet to Sing the Matchless Love – music
 189: O Thou, Before the World Began – music
 222: Hear Thou Our Hymn, O Lord – words and music
 245: This House We Dedicate to Thee – music
 257: Rejoice! A Glorious Sound Is Heard – music
 323: Rise Up, O Men of God (Men's Choir) – music

References 

 

1892 births
1973 deaths
20th-century American musicians
20th-century classical musicians
American Latter Day Saint hymnwriters
Boston University alumni
Burials at Salt Lake City Cemetery
Chicago Musical College alumni
Latter Day Saints from Utah
New England Conservatory alumni
Tabernacle Choir organists
University of Utah alumni